Sir Kenneth James Keith  (born 19 November 1937) is a New Zealand judge. He was elected to the International Court of Justice in November 2005, serving a nine-year term during the years 2006 through 2015.

Keith was educated at the Auckland Grammar School and studied law at the University of Auckland, Victoria University of Wellington, and Harvard Law School. He was a faculty member of Victoria University from 1962 to 1964 and from 1966 to 1991. He served in the New Zealand Department of External Affairs during the early 1960s, and as a member of the United Nations Secretariat from 1968 to 1970. After this, he was Director of the New Zealand Institute of International Affairs and later became President of the New Zealand Law Commission. He was also a member of the Royal Commission on the Electoral System which was key in changing New Zealand's electoral system. In 1993 he was a member of the Working Party on the Reorganisation of the Income Tax Act 1976 which was instrumental in launching a fundamental reform the way New Zealand tax legislation was written.

From 1996 to 2003, Keith was a Judge of the Court of Appeal of New Zealand and was a member of the Judicial Committee of the Privy Council in London. He was subsequently one of the inaugural appointments to the new Supreme Court of New Zealand which replaced the Judicial Committee of the Privy Council as from 1 July 2004. Prior to his appointment to the International Court of Justice, he sat (as required) as a Judge of Appeal in Samoa (since 1982), the Cook Islands (since 1982) and Niue (since 1995), and Judge of the Supreme Court of Fiji. He has also sat as the chair of a North American Free Trade Agreement (NAFTA) Tribunal (UPS v Canada).

Legal career

In 1961, Keith was admitted to the New Zealand Bar, and in 1994 appointed a Queen's Counsel. In 1996 Keith was appointed as a Judge of High Court of New Zealand and the Court of Appeal of New Zealand On 21 May 1998 Keith was appointed to the Privy Council and in 2004 was appointed to the Supreme Court of New Zealand.

Keith is the first New Zealander to be elected to the International Court of Justice (2006–2015), having previously presented as a member of the New Zealand legal team in the Nuclear Tests cases before the International Court of Justice in 1973, 1974 and 1995.

He is currently serving as a Judge ad hoc in two cases before the ICJ, appointed by Azerbaijan.

Honours and awards

In the 1988 Queen's Birthday Honours, Keith was appointed a Knight Commander of the Order of the British Empire, for services to law reform and legal education, and in the 2007 Queen's Birthday Honours he was appointed a Member of the Order of New Zealand.

Lectures

 Interpreting in International Courts and Tribunals in the Lecture Series of the United Nations Audiovisual Library of International Law
 The International Court of Justice – The Reflections of One Judge as He Leaves Office in the Lecture Series of the United Nations Audiovisual Library of International Law
 Openness in International Law in the Lecture Series of the United Nations Audiovisual Library of International Law
 Asia and International Law: A New Era Distinguished Speakers Panel in the Lecture Series of the United Nations Audiovisual Library of International Law
 Aspects of the Judicial Process in National and International Courts and Tribunals in the Lecture Series of the United Nations Audiovisual Library of International Law
 The Rainbow Warrior Case in the Lecture Series of the United Nations Audiovisual Library of International Law
 The Role of International Law in National Law in the Lecture Series of the United Nations Audiovisual Library of International Law
 The International Court of Justice and criminal justice in the Lecture Series of the United Nations Audiovisual Library of International Law
 The International Court of Justice - The Reflections of One Judge as He Leaves Office in the Lecture Series of the United Nations Audiovisual Library of International Law
 Interpreting in International Courts and Tribunals in the Lecture Series of the United Nations Audiovisual Library of International Law

Notes

External links

 Biography from the Supreme Court of New Zealand website
 Story on appointment
 
 Press release from the Prime Minister of New Zealand
 www.dpmc.govt.nz

1937 births
International Court of Justice judges
Living people
Harvard Law School alumni
21st-century New Zealand judges
Academic staff of the Victoria University of Wellington
People educated at Auckland Grammar School
Court of Appeal of New Zealand judges
Supreme Court of New Zealand judges
20th-century New Zealand judges
Members of the Judicial Committee of the Privy Council
New Zealand judges on the courts of Samoa
New Zealand judges on the courts of Fiji
New Zealand people of Scottish descent
Supreme Court of Fiji justices
New Zealand Anglicans
Members of the Order of New Zealand
New Zealand Knights Commander of the Order of the British Empire
New Zealand King's Counsel
New Zealand members of the Privy Council of the United Kingdom
New Zealand judges of United Nations courts and tribunals